The 1964 Texas Western Miners football team was an American football team that represented Texas Western College (now known as University of Texas at El Paso) as an independent during the 1964 NCAA University Division football season. In its second and final season under head coach Warren Harper, the team compiled a 0–8–2 record and was outscored by a total of 217 to 64.

Schedule

References

Texas Western
UTEP Miners football seasons
College football winless seasons
Texas Western Miners football